Abhishekapuram is a suburb of the city of Tiruchirappalli in Tamil Nadu, India. It constitutes one of the four zones of the Tiruchirappalli Municipal Corporation.

Notes 

Neighbourhoods and suburbs of Tiruchirappalli